La Gerdu or Lagerdu may refer to:
 La Gerdu, Kerman